Tomnatic is a commune in Timiș County, Romania. It is composed of a single village, Tomnatic. It was part of Lovrin commune until 2004, when it was split off.

History 
Near Tomnatic took place the last battle between Ahtum, the leader of Romanians, Pechenegs and Bulgars in the rough territory of today's Banat, and the Hungarian invaders led by Chanadinus, a rebellious general of Ahtum, in 1003 or 1030 (the date of the battle is disputed).

Tomnatic first appears in written history in 1000. In the Middle Ages, there was a settlement of Romanians and Serbs, Naghiuz. It was inhabited until the end of the Ottoman period, because Marsigli, in 1690–1700, mentions the Nagyeösz estate. With the reconquest of Banat from the Turks in 1716, the colonization of the region began. In 1772, at Tomnatic were settled colonists from the Alsace–Lorraine area, mostly French. 62% of the first settlers came from the Château-Salins area of France (on the border with Germany), 8% from Luxembourg, 5% from Baden, 5% from Bavaria and the rest from other parts of Germany. 200 houses were originally built, according to the plans of engineer Antonius von Triebswetter. The name of the new Franco-German village was given in his honor: Triebswetter. 

Tomnatic was for a long time the largest "French" village in Banat. The Germans were located in the southern part of the village on the so-called Deutschgasse (German street), and the French lived in the rest of the village. In time there was an assimilation of the French by the Germans, other French left Tomnatic for other French colonies in the Serbian Banat. The last person to speak only French was recorded in 1890. Some words of French origin have been preserved in the local vocabulary and the names of some families are reminiscent of the French origins of the inhabitants: Bailly, Bourgeau, Boquel, Frecôt, Tirier, etc.

The local church was built between 1846 and 1850. The then bishop of Banat, French-born , equipped the place of worship with the high altar and the two side altars.

During the Hungarian administration, it was called Nagyösz, and after 1920 it took its current Romanian name. Just before the end of World War II, in January 1945, all ethnic German women between the ages of 18 and 30 and men between the ages of 16 and 45 were deported to the Soviet Union for reconstruction works. Subsequently, 1,002 people from Tomnatic (almost a quarter of the population) were deported to the Bărăgan steppe, irrespective of ethnicity.

Demographics 

Tomnatic had a population of 3,144 inhabitants at the 2011 census, up 2% from the 2002 census. Most inhabitants are Romanians (78.44%), larger minorities being represented by Roma (6.77%), Hungarians (3.98%), Germans (3.88%) and Ukrainians (1.43%). For 4.55% of the population, ethnicity is unknown. By religion, most inhabitants are Orthodox (69.85%), but there are also minorities of Roman Catholics (15.81%), Pentecostals (6.39%) and Greek Catholics (1.56%). For 4.55% of the population, religious affiliation is unknown.

Notable people 
  (1913–1984), actor, director and founding member of the German State Theater in Timișoara
  (b. 1946), journalist, poet and translator
  (b. 1948), writer and publicist

References 

Communes in Timiș County
Localities in Romanian Banat